Crawford Lake is a lake in geographic Milner Township in the Montreal River and Ottawa River drainage basins in Timiskaming District, Ontario, Canada. The primary outflow, at the northeast, is an unnamed creek to Long Lake, which flows via Gowganda Lake and the Montreal River to Lake Timiskaming on the Ottawa River.

References

Lakes of Timiskaming District